Moore Township is a township in Marion County, Kansas, United States.  As of the 2010 census, the township population was 73.

Geography

Cities and towns
The township contains the following settlements:
 No cities or unincorporated communities.

Cemeteries
The township contains the following cemeteries:
 Durham Baptist Church Cemetery, located in Section 3 T18S R1E.
 Pankratz Cemetery, located in Section 3 T18S R1E.

References

Further reading

External links
 Marion County website
 City-Data.com
 Marion County maps: Current, Historic, KDOT

Townships in Marion County, Kansas
Townships in Kansas